Al Ahed Football Club is a Lebanese association football club based in the city of Beirut. The club's first ever participation in an Asian competition was in the 2005 AFC Cup, where they were drawn with Indian side Dempo and Jordanian side Al-Hussein in the group stage. After finishing second in the group, Ahed faced Sun Hei in the quarter-finals, to whom they lost 2–3 on aggregate. 

Prior to winning the competition, their best spell was in 2016, when they reached the semi-finals before being knocked out by Iraqi club Al-Quwa Al-Jawiya 3–4 on aggregate. In 2019, Ahed defeated North Korean side April 25 to win the AFC Cup: they became the first Lebanese side to do so, after Nejmeh and Safa's defeats in the 2005 and 2008 finals, respectively.

Matches

Notes
Goals by Ahed are listed first.
GS: Group stage
R16: Round of 16
QF: Quarter-final
ZSF: Zonal semi-final
SF: Semi-final
ZF: Zonal final
F: Final

References

Asian football
Ahed